The California State Open is the California state open golf tournament, open to both amateur and professional golfers. It is organized by the Southern California section of the PGA of America. It was first played in 1900 and has been played at a variety of courses around the state. It was considered a PGA Tour event in the 1920s and 1930s.

Winners

2022 Zihao Jin
2021 Matt Wilson
2020 No tournament
2019 Josh Anderson
2018 Andre de Decker
2017 David Gazzolo
2016 David Gazzolo
2015 Bryan Martin
2014 Chris Gilman
2013 Ray Beaufils
2012 Hyunseok Lim
2011 John Ellis
2010 Michael McCabe
2009 Mark Warman
2008 Kyle Thurston
2007 Drew Scott
2006 Ji Hwan Park (amateur)
2005 Eric Meichtry
2004 Jason Gore
2003 John Wilson
2002 No tournament
2001 Michael Block
2000 Rich Barcelo
1999 Todd Fischer
1998 Todd Demsey
1997 Jason Gore (amateur)
1996 Dennis Paulson
1995 Kevin Burton
1994 Jeff Bari
1993 Clinton Whitelaw
1992 Mark Wurtz
1991 Kirk Triplett
1990 Dennis Paulson
1989 Brad Bell
1988 Jim Woodward
1987 John Flannery
1986 Jim Woodward
1985 Brad Greer
1984 Greg Twiggs
1983 Brett Upper
1982 John McComish
1981 Jeff Sanders
1980 Tim Norris
1979 Jim Petralia
1978 Rex Caldwell
1977 Ron Hoyt
1976 Bill Brask
1975 Jimmy Powell
1974 Roger Maltbie
1973 Mike Brannan
1972 Steve Oppermann
1971 Greg Trompas
1970 Terry Small
1969 Terry Small
1968 Ron Reif
1967 Chuck Green
1966 Pinky Stevenson
1965 Bud Holscher
1964 Lee Raymond
1963 Jack O'Keefe
1962 Ron Lettelier
1961 Duff Lawrence
1960 Bud Holscher
1959 Jerry Barber
1958 Dick Knight
1957 Eric Mooli
1956 Art Bell
1955 Ralph Blomquist
1954 Gene Littler
1953 No tournament
1952 Lloyd Mangrum
1951 Zell Eaton
1950 Dutch Harrison
1949 Smiley Quick
1948 Smiley Quick
1947 Art Bell
1946 Tal Smith
1945 George Fazio
1944 Ernie Piper
1943 Grant Leonard
1942 Johnny Dawson
1941 Mark Fry
1940 Olin Dutra
1939 Art Bell
1938 George Von Elm
1937 Fred Morrison
1936 Fred Morrison
1935 Cam Poget
1934 Horton Smith
1933 Leo Diegel
1932 Fred Morrison
1931 Leo Diegel
1930 Jack Terron
1928–29 No tournament
1927 Willie Hunter
1926 Willie Hunter
1925 Macdonald Smith
1924 Macdonald Smith
1923 Joe Kirkwood, Sr.
1922 Jim Barnes
1921 Eddie Loos
1920 John Black
1919 John Black
1916–18 No tournament
1915 Walter Hagen
1901–14 No tournament
1900 Willie Smith

References

External links
PGA of America – Southern California section
List of winners

Former PGA Tour events
Golf in California
State Open golf tournaments
PGA of America sectional tournaments